Prairie Mountain is located in the Rocky Mountains of Alberta.  Due to its proximity to the city of Calgary the hike up the south side is heavily trafficked, and sees use every month of the year.

References

Two-thousanders of Alberta
Alberta's Rockies